The 1999 New Zealand Grand Prix event for open wheel racing cars was held at Ruapana Park near Christchurch on 6 December 1999. It was the forty-fifth New Zealand Grand Prix and was open to Formula Holden cars.

Classification

Qualifying

References

New Zealand Grand Prix
Grand Prix
Formula Holden
New Zealand